Ruk Jaana Nahin was an Indian soap opera that premiered on 19 December 2011 on STAR Plus and ended on 23 November 2012. The series starred Pooja Sharma and Aniruddh Dave.

Plot
Sanchi, the main character, is a vulnerable girl who has led a sheltered life. She shifts with her family to the city of Varanasi and begins to pursue her college education. Once she steps out of the security of her home, she realizes that she can’t always win through confrontation in the male-dominated society. She decides to own every heart and rule every mind with her intelligence and presence of mind. What makes Sanchi different from any other protagonist on television is that she does not confront and fight, she does not protest or walk away. She faces the challenges and changes decisions and attitudes of one and all with her intelligent approach. A never-before-seen character on Indian television, Sanchi is an ordinary girl from your neighborhood who emerges as a beacon of hope as she navigates her way through the world in a quest to fend for herself and her family. A goon name Indu falls in love with her. He troubles Saanchi and her family. After that Sanchi vows to keep Indu away from her family as she him a lot. Indu comes to Sanchi's house to finalize the marriage which is next day Sanchi bravely says yes the next day she dresses up like a dancer and come to the marriage. She wants the address of his mother to inform about whats happening. She is successful in her plan with her best friend. but when Indu's mother comes she is convinced to see Sanchi and agrees with her son. Sanchi's plan fails that moment and she plans for some other trick. She calls the panditji to see horoscope the panditji is in the side of Sanchi and tells a lie to Indu and his mother that if Sanchi marries him that means Indu's mother will die. Indu broken hearted for his mother's sake leaves Sanchi and goes. Even if he left Sanchi but it was difficult for him to forget her from his heart and mind for this Indu's mother comes to Sanchi's house for a plan to make Indu hate Sanchi forever. she tells her to wear modern clothes in front of Indu which Indu will dislike. she follows her instruction and wears modern clothes to college next day. Indu gets furious seeing Sanchi in short dress. While the college people are shocked to see Sanchi in short dress. They flirt with her. Seeing this Indu gets more angry. He goes in the classroom and bangs on the door tells everybody to come out of the classroom. He tells Sanchi to wear full clothes and  Sanchi comes to tell him that who are you to tell me what should I wear. Listening to this he walks away from her and get heavily drunk. The next day she wears modern clothes and comes to indu's house. by indu's mother's plan Sanchi insults him and walks away from there Indu gets hurt. While Sanchi is walking on the road some boys come and flirt with her. Indu sees this and goes to her he hits the boys and the boys run away. Furious Indu gives money to her tells her to buy good clothes.

The question is will Sanchi accept Indu? or will She tell him the truth about the plan?

Cast

Production

In March 2012, the shoot of the series was halted for a while when a leopard entered the sets of the series in Film City at Goregaon.

The series was initially reported to end in December 2012. However, it was later confirmed to end on last week of November 2012 and it ended on 23 November 2012.

Reception
The Indian Express reviewed, "The story is interesting. The setting is not your usual badi havelis but a realistic background where characters speak authentic language of the region. The dialogues are crisp and refreshing. Credit goes to the producers Paresh Rawal and Hemal Thakkar, the writer and co-producer Kamal Pandey and director Santram Verma to put together a watchable show. The performances too are consistently good. Leading the pack is Pooja Sharma as Sanchi, who is raw but has an endearing quality. The story moves at a good pace and so far has been both engaging and entertaining. It's a great respite from mundane family dramas."

References

External links
 Official Website on Star Plus

2011 Indian television series debuts
StarPlus original programming
2012 Indian television series endings